A December to Remember is a Christmas album released by country music artist Aaron Tippin. The album is his first Christmas album, and it includes a mix of original songs and covers. Tippin's rendition of "Jingle Bell Rock" charted on the Hot Country Songs charts in late 2001.

Track listing

Personnel
 Mike Brignardello - bass guitar
 Melodie Crittenden - background vocals
 Eric Darken - bells, chimes, cowbell, cymbals, shaker, sleigh bells, tambourine, whistle, wood block
 Paul Franklin - lap steel guitar, pedal steel guitar
 Aubrey Haynie - fiddle, mandolin, octave fiddle
 Wes Hightower - background vocals
 Jim Hoke - harmonica, tenor saxophone
 Liana Manis - background vocals
 Brent Mason - electric guitar, gut string guitar
 Steve Nathan - Hammond B-3 organ, piano, synthesizer, synthesizer horns, synthesizer strings, Wurlitzer
 John Wesley Ryles - background vocals
 Aaron Tippin - lead vocals
 Biff Watson - acoustic guitar, electric guitar, gut string guitar

Chart performance

Lyric Street Records albums
Aaron Tippin albums
2001 Christmas albums
Christmas albums by American artists
Country Christmas albums